= Clinical and Experimental Dermatology =

- Discipline: Dermatology
- Language: English

Publication details
- Publisher: Wiley
- Impact factor: 3.470 (2020)

Standard abbreviations
- ISO 4: Clin. Exp. Dermatol.

Links
- Journal homepage; Online archive

Clinical and Experimental Dermatology is a peer-reviewed medical journal provide relevant and educational material for practising clinicians and dermatological researchers. The journal is published by Wiley.

== Abstracting and indexing ==
The journal is abstracted and indexed in:

- Abstracts in Anthropology (Sage)
- Abstracts on Hygiene & Communicable Diseases (CABI)
- Academic Search (EBSCO Publishing)
- Academic Search Alumni Edition (EBSCO Publishing)
- Academic Search Elite (EBSCO Publishing)
- Academic Search Premier (EBSCO Publishing)
- AgBiotech News & Information (CABI)
- AgBiotechNet (CABI)

According to the Journal Citation Reports, the journal has a 2020 impact factor of 3.470.
